The 2021–21 season of Ghanaian club Asante Kotoko S.C. The season covered the period from 20 November 2020 to 8 August 2021.

Season overview 
Asante Kotoko ended the 2020-21 season without a trophy after placing second in the domestic the league and was knock out by Berekum Chelsea F.C. in the FA Cup

Technical team 
The technical team

Squad

Roaster beginning of season

Pre-season and friendlies 
   

The season was delayed as a result of COVID-19 pandemic in Ghana, causing the team to start preparations in September 2020. Kotoko however pitched camp in Koforidua.

Competitions

Premier League

League table

References 

Asante Kotoko S.C.
2020–21 Ghana Premier League by team